Brampton Etobicoke District Cricket League, popularly known as BEDCL is one of the most popular cricket leagues in Canada, it is the body responsible for the governance of cricket played in the regions of Brampton and Etobicoke in the province of Ontario, Canada.

History 
The BEDCL formerly just known as an EDCL was formed in the early 1980s, by a group of enthusiastic cricket lovers. The league kept growing with cricket getting popular in the province of Ontario. The league now collaborated EDCL - The Etobicoke & District Cricket League (which has been in existence for over 30 years) and the BCA - The Brampton Cricket Association (which has been in existence since 2004).

Member Clubs 
The BEDCL currently operates with 76 member teams, consisting of 1300 cricketers playing actively playing the game of cricket, making it the biggest cricket leagues in Canada.

Formats 
The BEDCL runs various formats of the cricket leagues, which include

 50 over Format
 Morning T25 Format
 Youth Evening League
 Youth Saturday Morning League
 Mayors Cup T20 Evening

Grounds 
The Brampton Etobicoke District Cricket League works very closely with the City of Brampton, City of Toronto government, City of Mississauga, Powerade Center, Humber College and the City of Waterloo in order to arrange ground facilities for the games. Below is the list of grounds, in which the BEDCL league matches are scheduled.

Affiliation 
In 2010, Cricket Council of Ontario was recognized as official representative and governance body to [Cricket Canada] from the province of Ontario. CCO represents approximately 90% of cricket playing population in Ontario. BEDCL has been officially represented by CCO since 2010.

The Executive Members of the Board 
 President: Mr.Praimnauth Persaud
 Vice President: Mr. Gokul Kamat
 Secretary: Rumi Jasavala
 Treasurer: Jaswinder Basra
 Asst.Secretary/Treasurer: Asif Quraishi
 League Statistician, Mr. Gokul Kamat

References
 Official Website of the BEDCL Cricket League
 Official Website of the Cricket council of Ontario
 Official Website of Cricket Canada
 List of Cricket Leagues in Canada

External links 
 Cricket in City of Mississauga
 Thackery Park, City of Toronto

Cricket leagues
Canadian domestic cricket competitions